Reynold Henry Hillenbrand (July 19, 1904 – May 22, 1979) was a seminal American Roman Catholic Church leader in the Liturgical Movement, Chicago priest and seminary rector,
pastor, and “Specialized Catholic Action” chaplain following the methods of Belgian Cardinal Joseph Cardijn, who mentored clergy and laity in the Young Christian Students, Young Christian Workers, Friendship House, the Cana Conference, the Christian Family Movement, the Catholic Labor Alliance, and La Leche League.

Background
Reynold Henry Hillenbrand was born on July 19, 1904, in Chicago, Illinois, second among nine children and grandchild of German immigrants in Wisconsin. His parents were George Hillenbrand and Eleanor Schmidt and members of Saint Michael’s parish in Chicago’s Old Town.

Hillenbrand attended Quigley Preparatory Seminary and Saint Mary of the Lake Seminary (Mundelein Seminary), where he founded and edited the school's daily newspaper, The Candle; he was also a member of the school orchestra and choir.  He completed a License and Doctorate at Saint Mary of the Lake (and would eventually become its rector)).

Career
In 1929, Hillenbrand was ordained into the priesthood.

In 1931, Cardinal George Mundelein named Hillenbrand, age 31, rector of Saint Mary of the Lake Seminary. 

Msgr. Hillenbrand's three-part approach of faithfully presenting papal teaching, calling lay apostles, and bringing laity through the Catholic liturgy to social action, helped form US Catholic leadership prior to the Second Vatican Council, which his liturgical innovations during the Liturgical reforms of Pope Pius XII anticipated.

Personally recruited by Cardinal George Mundelein to attend Archbishop Quigley Preparatory Seminary, Hillenbrand championed the causes of labor and race relations, and brought the first women speakers, Dorothy Day, and later Baroness Catherine de Hueck Doherty, to the University of St. Mary of the Lake, his alma mater, where he served as rector from 1936-1944. Several of Hillenbrand's seminary students, including Alfred Leo Abramowicz, Romeo Roy Blanchette, Daniel Cantwell, Michael R. P. Dempsey, John Joseph Egan, Thomas Joseph Grady, George G. Higgins, Timothy Joseph Lyne, Eugene F. Lyons, Edward A. Marciniak, John L. May, Paul Casimir Marcinkus, Cletus F. O'Donnell, William J. Quinn, and James A. Voss, became influential in social action and/or in both pre- and post-Vatican II American Catholic affairs.

Hillenbrand Books, published by The Liturgical Institute at the University of Saint Mary of the Lake / Mundelein Seminary, in collaboration with Liturgy Training Publications, is a scholarly book series named in Hillenbrand's honor.  A Reynold Hillenbrand Institute was based in Chicago's archdiocesan college seminary from 1992–94, moved to the University of Saint Mary of the Lake, and closed at the approximate time of the founding of the Liturgical Institute there in 2000.  A Hillenbrand lecture series continues at the Liturgical Institute, most recently presented by Denver Archbishop Charles Joseph Chaput on
June 24, 2010.

References

External links
 eCatholic:  Monsignor Reynold Hillenbrand

  Hillenbrand and the Sacred Liturgy, a memorial website to Reynold Hillenbrand at the Liturgical Institute, Mundelein Seminary, University of St. Mary of the Lake, Mundelein, IL
  Reynold Hillenbrand papers, University of Notre Dame Archives, South Bend, IN
 Gracewing:  Hillenbrand Books

American activists
Roman Catholic Archdiocese of Chicago
People from Chicago
Roman Catholic activists
University of Saint Mary of the Lake alumni
1904 births
1979 deaths
20th-century American Roman Catholic priests
Religious leaders from Illinois
Catholics from Illinois